Joseph Goodall (born 22 June 1992) is an Australian professional boxer who has held the WBC Australasia heavyweight title since March 2021. As an amateur he won a silver medal at the 2014 Commonwealth Games and bronze at the 2017 World Championships, becoming Australia's first medalist at the World Championships since 1991.

Professional boxing record

References

External links
 

Living people
1992 births
Australian male boxers
Sportspeople from Bendigo
Super-heavyweight boxers
Boxers at the 2014 Commonwealth Games
Commonwealth Games medallists in boxing
Commonwealth Games silver medallists for Australia
AIBA World Boxing Championships medalists
Medallists at the 2014 Commonwealth Games